Kaikōura (or Kaikoura before 2008) is a New Zealand parliamentary electorate, returning a single MP to the New Zealand House of Representatives.

Population centres
The Kaikōura electorate covers the north-eastern South Island, from Cook Strait in the north to the Ashley River / Rakahuri in the south. Its biggest town is Blenheim; other towns include Amberley, Ashley, Cheviot, Culverden, Hanmer Springs, Havelock, Kaikōura and Picton. The electorate boundaries were not changed in either the 2007 or 2013/14 boundary reviews.

History
Kaikōura is one of the original 60 electorates drawn ahead of the change to Mixed Member Proportional (MMP) voting in 1996. It was made up by merging all of the old Marlborough seat with a large portion of Rangiora. Like the two electorates it replaced, Kaikōura is a safe seat for the National Party, returning a National MP at every election since it was created.

The first representative in 1996 was Doug Kidd, who was previously the MP for Marlborough. Scott served for two parliamentary terms before retiring from politics and returning to the medical profession in 2005.

The  was won by Colin King, who served for three parliamentary terms. In December 2013, King was deselected as National's candidate for Kaikoura, losing a selection challenge by Stuart Smith, who won the general election in September  with a preliminary majority of 11,510 votes. When final results were released, the Green Party had gained an additional seat, and Browning was confirmed as a list MP.

Members of Parliament
Key

List MPs
Members of Parliament elected from party lists in elections where that person also unsuccessfully contested the Kaikōura electorate. Unless otherwise stated, all MPs terms began and ended at general elections.

Election results

2020 election

2017 election

2014 election

2011 election

Electorate (as at 26 November 2011): 45,958

2008 election

2005 election

2002 election

1999 election

1996 election

Table footnotes

References

External links
Kaikōura electorate profile, Parliamentary Library

New Zealand electorates
1996 establishments in New Zealand
Waimakariri District